Wdzydze may refer to the following places in Poland:

Wdzydze Lake
Wdzydze Kiszewskie
Wdzydze Tucholskie

See also
Olpuch Wdzydze railway station, railway station in Olpuch